Harlan is an unincorporated census-designated place (CDP) in Springfield Township, Allen County, in the U.S. state of Indiana. As of the 2010 census, Harlan had a population of 1,634.

History
Harlan was laid out in 1853 by Lewis Reichelderfer and Julia Ann (Ranck) Reichelderfer, who were husband and wife. It originally consisted of two communities, Harlan and Maysville. The border between the two towns was Georgetown Road (Indiana State Road 37), with Harlan being on the north side of the road.

The post office at Harlan has been in operation since 1851. Maysville faded from existence soon afterwards.

Geography

Education
Harlan is within East Allen County Schools (EACS) and is zoned to Woodlan Elementary School and Woodlan Junior/Senior High School.

Demographics

References

External links

Harlan Days Community Festival

Census-designated places in Allen County, Indiana
Census-designated places in Indiana
Fort Wayne, IN Metropolitan Statistical Area